Arctic Wolf Networks is a cybersecurity company that provides security monitoring to detect and respond to cyber threats. The company monitors on-premises computers, networks and cloud based information assets from malicious activity such as cybercrime,  ransomware, and malicious software attacks.

History
Founded in 2012, Arctic Wolf focused on providing managed security services to small and midmarket organizations. The company was listed as a Gartner Cool Vendor in security for mid sized enterprises in June 2018. In 2019 and again in 2020, the company was named to the Deloitte Fast 500 list of fast-growing companies. In 2021, the company became part of IDC MarketScape Leader and was part of CRN Security 100 List. In 2022, CRN listed the company number 1 in its Top 10 Cybersecurity products and tool.

In December 2018, Arctic Wolf announced the acquisition of the company RootSecure, and subsequently turned the RootSecure product offering into a vulnerability management service.

In March 2020, following a $60M D Round of funding, the company announced moving its headquarters from Sunnyvale, California to Eden Prairie, Minnesota in October 2020.

In October 2020, Arctic Wolf announced a $200M E Round of funding at a valuation of 1.3B$.

On July 19, 2021, Arctic Wolf secured $150M at Series F, tripling its valuation to $4.3B.

On February 1, 2022, Arctic Wolf acquired Tetra Defense.

References

External links
 

Software companies established in 2012
Network management
Software companies of the United States
American companies established in 2012
Computer security companies
Information technology companies of the United States
Security companies of the United States